The Eastern Caribbean Gas Pipeline is a proposed natural gas pipeline from Tobago to other eastern Caribbean islands.

History
The idea had its genesis with Patrick Manning, Prime Minister of Trinidad and Tobago, who announced in 2002 that his country was going to undertake one of the largest civil engineering projects in the Caribbean region.

The project suffered a brief setback when Venezuelan leader Hugo Chavez petitioned intensely that the pipeline should instead originate from Venezuela and reach further into the north, including Cuba and the United States.

In March 2010 the Barbados indicated after a two-year hiatus that it would seek to move toward the negotiations stage for the first stage of the  pipeline from Tobago to Barbados.

Network
The second stage it would be expanded to Saint Lucia, Dominica, Martinique, and Guadeloupe.

Project company 
The project is developed by the Eastern Caribbean Gas Pipeline Company Limited (ECGPC).  60% of the company is jointly owned by 
the United States companies Beowulf Energy LLC and First Reserve Energy International Fund. Rest is owned by the Trinidad and Tobago companies Guardian Holdings (15%), Unit Trust Corporation (15%), and the National Gas Company of Trinidad and Tobago (10%).

See also

 Puerto Rico – Virgin Islands pipeline
 Trans-Caribbean pipeline

References

External links 

Companies of the Caribbean
Natural gas pipeline companies
Natural gas pipelines in Trinidad and Tobago
Natural gas pipelines in Barbados
Natural gas pipelines in Saint Lucia
Natural gas pipelines in Dominica
Natural gas pipelines in Martinique
Natural gas pipelines in Guadeloupe
Proposed pipelines in the Caribbean
Submarine pipelines